Natalie Meyer (May 20, 1930 – September 23, 2021) was an American politician who served as the Secretary of State of Colorado from 1983 to 1995.

She died on September 23, 2021, in Denver, Colorado, at age 91.

References

External links

1930 births
2021 deaths
Secretaries of State of Colorado
Colorado Republicans
People from Henderson, North Carolina